The 2021–22 season was FC Chernihiv's second season. It competed in the Ukrainian Second League. The sponsor of the club was Joma.

Players

Squad information

Transfers

In

Out

Pre-season and friendlies

Competitions

Ukrainian Second League

Results

Ukrainian Cup

Statistics

Appearances and goals 

|-
! colspan=16 style=background:#dcdcdc; text-align:center| Goalkeepers

|-
! colspan=17 style=background:#dcdcdc; text-align:center| Defenders

 

|-
! colspan=16 style=background:#dcdcdc; text-align:center| Midfielders 

|-
! colspan=16 style=background:#dcdcdc; text-align:center| Forwards

|-
! colspan=16 style=background:#dcdcdc; text-align:center| Players transferred out during the season

 
Last updated: 3 February 2022

Goalscorers

Last updated: 27 November 2021

Clean sheets

Last updated: 16 October 2021

Disciplinary record

Last updated: 21 November 2021

References

External links 

 

FC Chernihiv
FC Chernihiv seasons
FC Chernihiv